A Eurohound (also known as a Eurodog or Scandinavian hound) is a type of dog bred for sled dog racing. The Eurohound is typically crossbred from the Alaskan husky group and any of a number of pointing breeds ("pointers").

History 
A Eurohound is a cross between an Alaskan husky and German Shorthaired Pointer. Scandinavia was the first to use Eurohounds in competitive sled dog racing. The Eurohound is not purebred, and is not a breed of dog, but a crossbreed, its parents being deliberately crossed in order to produce progeny with specific traits. The Eurohound need cooler weather to run, the European Canicross Championships is held from September to May to avoid heat.

Crossbreeding 
Rather than inbreeding similar-looking dogs in order to create a new breed with a consistent appearance, Eurohound racers crossbreed for specific working traits and health. Crossbreeding includes breeding between two established breeds, with two tightly bred but unrelated gene pools, and breeding the first generation cross back to one of the purebred breeds. Crossbreeding is also done for the purpose of heterosis (hybrid vigor). The dogs most often used for Eurodog crosses are purebred German Shorthaired Pointers (and English Pointers), other pointers, and Alaskan huskies (Gareth Wright lines primarily) from tightly bred sprint dog lines used for racing.

A first-generation Eurohound cross (fifty percent pointing breed, fifty percent husky) have short coats, suitable for sprint races, which don't involve resting or sleeping on the trail. When the first-generation cross is crossed again with the Alaskan husky, the resulting generation can have thicker coats, suitable for longer-distance teams. Most distance mushers prefer the pointer genetics to only be 1/8 in a dog for maximum performance.  This then reduces the Eurohound influence, and dogs should be termed Alaskan Husky crosses or mixed hounds. The Eurohound is sleeker than a husky and can hit speeds of 25 miles per hour.

The term "Eurohound" was coined by Ivana Nolke, to distinguish the European racing dogs being imported into Alaska. Greyhound crossbred with German Shorthaired Pointers are known as "greysters" and popular for dryland racing, and limited-class snow racing.

Appearance and breeds 
Fairly common features of fifty percent crosses are half-dropped ears, black with white blazing as shown in the photo, or solid with patches of spots. Some completely spotted dogs appear as well. Once the percentage of pointer drops, the dogs start to look more like Alaskan huskies. The dogs have a similar coat to German Shorthair Pointer and looks like standard hunting dogs.

The Alaskan husky sprint dog has been bred for performance, not appearance. The German Shorthaired Pointer and English Pointer gene pool too were bred for performance particularly hunting; the Scandinavian pointers from which the first Eurohounds came had been used historically for sled dog racing and hunting. The Eurohound was good for mushing and became widely used.

References

External links
Personal observation of some of the newer sled dog mixes

Sled dogs
Dog breeds originating in Norway
Dog crossbreeds